Year 1036 (MXXXVI) was a leap year starting on Thursday (link will display the full calendar) of the Julian calendar.

Events 
 By place 

Europe
 Summer – In Naples, Duke Sergius IV abdicates and retires to a monastery; he is succeeded by his son John V.
 A Zirid expeditionary force invades Sicily and takes Palermo from the Normans, but fails to fully reconquer the island.

 England 
 February 5 – Edward the Confessor's younger brother Alfred Aetheling is blinded and murdered, in an apparent attempt to seize the throne of England from Harold I.

 Africa 
 June 13 – Caliph al-Zahir li-i'zaz Din Allah dies after a 16-year reign. He is succeeded by his 6-year-old son al-Mustansir as ruler of the Fatimid Caliphate. Vizier Ali ibn Ahmad al-Jarjara'i will guide the regency for the first few years.

 China 
 The Tangut script is devised by Yeli Renrong, for Emperor Jing Zong of Western Xia.

 Japan 
 May 15 – Emperor Go-Ichijō dies at the age of 27 after a 20-year reign. He is succeeded by his brother Go-Suzaku as the 69th emperor of Japan.

 By topic 

 Religion 
 Pope Benedict IX is briefly forced out of Rome, but returns with the help of Emperor Conrad II (the Elder).
 The Flower Sermon first appears in Buddhist literature.

Births 
 Anselm of Lucca (the Younger), Italian bishop (d. 1086)
 Fujiwara no Hiroko, Japanese empress (d. 1127)
 Igor Yaroslavich, prince of Smolensk (d. 1060)
 Wang Shen, Chinese painter and poet (d. 1093 )

Deaths 
 February 5 – Alfred Aetheling, Anglo-Saxon prince 
 March 17 – Gebhard II, bishop of Regensburg
 May 15 – Go-Ichijō, emperor of Japan (b. 1008)
 June 12 – Tedald (or Theobald), Italian bishop
 June 13 – al-Zahir li-i'zaz Din Allah, Fatimid caliph (b. 1005)
 August 25 – Pilgrim, archbishop of Cologne
 Abu Nasr Mansur, Persian mathematician (b. 960)
 Alric of Asti (or Adalric), Lombard bishop
 Berengar of Gascony, French nobleman
 Emilia of Gaeta, Italian duchess and regent
 Fujiwara no Ishi, Japanese empress (b. 999)
 Hárek of Tjøtta, Norwegian Viking chieftain 
 Hisham III, Umayyad caliph of Córdoba (b. 973)

References